The Colleges of Medicine of South Africa (CMSA) is the custodian of the quality of medical care in South Africa. It is unique in the world in that its 29 constituent Colleges represent all the disciplines of medicine and dentistry. The only present route to specialisation in South Africa, is via a Fellowship conferred by the College. See Medical education in South Africa; .

History
CMSA was founded and financed in 1954 by members of the medical profession, and was registered as a non-profit making company in 1955. It has facilities in Cape Town and Johannesburg, including lecture venues and committee and reception rooms, and an office in Durban. In 2018, the College elected its first Black female president Dr Flavia Senkubuge.

Fellowships
The specialist qualifications obtained through The CMSA are known as Fellowships, a designation similar to that used in various countries. These are recognised by the Health Professions Council of South Africa as acceptable for specialist registration and are known throughout the world. 

For those medical and dental practitioners who do not wish to specialise, the CMSA offers Higher Diploma and Diploma qualifications which are registered by the HPCSA as additional qualifications. There is also an additional qualification for those who obtain a Certificate in one of the subspecialities.

Colleges of the CMSA
College of Anaesthetists
College of Cardiothoracic Surgeons
College of Clinical Pharmacologists
College of Dentistry
College of Dermatologists
College of Emergency Medicine
College of Family Physicians
College of Forensic Pathologists
College of Maxillo-Facial and Oral Surgeons
College of Medical Geneticists
College of Neurologists
College of Neurosurgeons
College of Nuclear Physicians
College of Obstetricians and Gynaecologists
College of Ophthalmologists
College of Orthopaedic Surgeons
College of Otorhinolaryngologists
College of Paediatric Surgeons
College of Paediatricians
College of Pathologists
College of Physicians
College of Plastic Surgeons
College of Psychiatrists
College of Public Health Medicine
College of Radiation Oncologists
College of Radiologists
College of Sports medicine
College of Surgeons
College of Urologists

References

External links
 Health Professions Council of South Africa

Medical education in South Africa
Science and technology in South Africa
Medical and health organisations based in South Africa